The Russian Second Division 2000 was the ninth edition of the Russian Second Division. There were 6 zones with 107 teams starting the competition (one was excluded before the end of the season).

Zone West

Overview

Standings

Top goalscorers
22 goals
 Dmitri Sachkov (FC Pskov)

19 goals
 Aleksandr Rogulin (FC Oazis Yartsevo)

15 goals
 Sergei Stepanov (FC Pskov)

13 goals
 Andrei Nikolayev (FC Severstal Cherepovets)
 Dmitri Podshivalov (FC Dynamo-2 Moscow)

12 goals
 Sergei Matveyev (FC Sportakademklub Moscow)
 Aleksandr Samorodov (FC Mosenergo Moscow)

11 goals
 Dmitri Akimov (FC Zenit-2 St. Petersburg)
 Dmitri Kalinin (FC Spartak Shchyolkovo)
 Dmitri Rudanov (FC Neftyanik Yaroslavl)

Zone Centre

Overview

Standings

Top goalscorers
18 goals
 Konstantin Genich (FC Khimki)

16 goals
 Nikolai Kovardayev (FC Khimki)
 Aleksandr Seredokhin (FC Lokomotiv Kaluga)
 Ruslan Usikov (FC Dynamo Bryansk)

15 goals
 Aleksei Kopilov (FC Oryol)

13 goals
 Sergei Kravchuk (FC Khimki)

12 goals
 Andrei Boldin (FC Kolomna)
 Vitali Milenin (FC Spartak Tambov)

11 goals
 Dmitri Pinin (FC Spartak-Orekhovo Orekhovo-Zuyevo)
 Andrei Cherenkov (FC Krasnoznamensk)

Zone South

Overview

Standings

Top goalscorers
30 goals
 Yusup Guguyev (FC Angush Nazran)

26 goals
 Stanislav Lebedintsev (FC SKA Rostov-on-Don)
 Isa Markhiyev (FC Angush Nazran)

20 goals
 Nikolai Komlichenko (FC Druzhba Maykop)

18 goals
 Konstantin Boyko (FC SKA Rostov-on-Don)
 Sergey Zelikov (FC SKA Rostov-on-Don)

17 goals
 Aleksandr Bocharnikov (FC Sudostroitel Astrakhan)

16 goals
 Andrey Perederiy (FC Avtodor Vladikavkaz)

15 goals
 Eduard Bogdanov (FC Dynamo Stavropol)
 Vitali Makarenko (FC Kavkazkabel Prokhladny)
 Musa Mazayaev (FC Druzhba Maykop)
 Anzor Mizov (FC Nart Nartkala)

Zone Povolzhye

Overview

Standings

Top goalscorers
26 goals
Anton Khazov (FC Torpedo-Viktoriya Nizhny Novgorod)

23 goals
Maksim Bondarenko (FC Rotor-2 Volgograd)

20 goals
Vladimir Pronin (FC Volga Ulyanovsk)

19 goals
Anatoli Lychagov (FC Energetik Uren)

14 goals
Dmitri Golubev (FC Metallurg Vyksa)

13 goals
Vitali Nikulkin (FC Svetotekhnika Saransk)
Dmitri Timofeyev (FC Diana Volzhsk)

12 goals
Aleksandr Fyodorov (FC Diana Volzhsk)

11 goals
Eduard Bazarov (FC Balakovo)
Andrei Chibrikov (FC Torpedo Pavlovo)
Denis Snimshchikov (FC Olimpiya Volgograd)

Zone Ural

Overview

Standings

Top goalscorers
36 goals
Igor Palachyov (FC Uralmash Yekaterinburg)

21 goals
Rustyam Fakhrutdinov (FC Neftekhimik Nizhnekamsk)

20 goals
Roman Strizhov (FC KAMAZ-Chally Naberezhnye Chelny)

18 goals
Vladimir Dzhubanov (FC KAMAZ-Chally Naberezhnye Chelny)

17 goals
Vitali Kakunin (FC Neftekhimik Nizhnekamsk)
Mikhail Tyufyakov (FC Neftekhimik Nizhnekamsk)

16 goals
Vladimir Raykov (FC Zenit Chelyabinsk)

14 goals
Sergei Polstyanov (FC Tyumen)

13 goals
Andrei Frolov (FC Tyumen)

12 goals
Stanislav Filonov (FC Metallurg-Metiznik Magnitogorsk)
Maksim Kovalyov (FC Uralets Nizhny Tagil)

Zone East

Overview

Standings

Top goalscorers
14 goals
Aleksandr Popov (FC Zvezda Irkutsk)

13 goals
Stanislav Chaplygin (FC Metallurg Novokuznetsk)
Sergei Pervushin (FC SKA-Energiya Khabarovsk)

12 goals
Anatoli Panchenko (FC Dynamo Barnaul)

10 goals
Shamil Bagizayev (FC Sibiryak Bratsk)

9 goals
Aleksandr Garin (FC Luch Vladivostok)
Oleg Lidrik (FC Chkalovets-Olimpik Novosibirsk)
Sergei Matochkin (FC Selenga Ulan-Ude)
Aleksandr Tikhonkikh (FC Zvezda Irkutsk)

8 goals
Aleksei Korobchenko (FC SKA-Energiya Khabarovsk)
Aleksei Latushkin (FC Okean Nakhodka)
Aleksei Poddubskiy (FC SKA-Energiya Khabarovsk)

Promotion play-offs

Neftekhimik won 4–1 on aggregate and was promoted to the 2001 Russian First Division.

3–3 on aggregate, Severstal won on away goals rule and was promoted to the 2001 Russian First Division. However, Severstal could not find necessary financing in time and the spot was eventually given to Khimki instead.

Kuban Krasnodar won 1–0 on aggregate and was promoted to the 2001 Russian First Division.

See also
2000 Russian Top Division
2000 Russian First Division

External links
Russian Second Division 2000 at Footballfacts

3
1999
Russia
Russia